Amanita lividopallescens, also known as the pale amanita, is a species of Amanita in Europe that grows near oaks.

References

External links
 
 

lividopallescens